Imlay may refer to:

People
Chris Imlay, an American musician
James Henderson Imlay, a United States Representative from New Jersey
Gilbert Imlay (1754–1828), land speculator, author, intimate of Mary Wollstonecraft
Fanny Imlay, daughter of Mary Wollstonecraft and Gilbert Imlay
Three brothers born in Scotland:
 Alexander Imlay (1794–1847), Australian landowner and speculator
 George Imlay (c1794–1846), Australian landowner and speculator
 Peter Imlay (1797–1881), Australian and New Zealand landowner and speculator

Places
Imlay Township, Michigan
Imlay City, Michigan
Imlay, Nevada
Imlay, South Dakota
Mount Imlay National Park in Australia